Stuart Leonard Miller (December 26, 1927 – January 4, 2015), nicknamed The Butterfly Man, was a pitcher in Major League Baseball who played for the St. Louis Cardinals (1952–56), Philadelphia Phillies (1956), New York/San Francisco Giants (1957–62), Baltimore Orioles (1963–67) and Atlanta Braves (1968). He batted and threw right-handed. In a 16-season career, Miller posted a 105–103 record with a 3.24 earned run average, 1164 strikeouts, and 154 saves in 704 games pitched (93 as a starter).

Playing career
Miller was named an All-Star for the Giants in 1961. Manager Alvin Dark thought Miller's 1961 season was the best of any relief pitcher who ever played for Dark. "It got so the starters would work seven innings and look to the bullpen expecting to see him running in."

He was involved in one of the more memorable moments in All Star Game history, albeit for an exaggeration of the event in question. In the embellished version, it is reported that the wind gust blew the 165-pound Miller off the pitcher's mound. Kaline later scored on an error by Ken Boyer on Rocky Colavito's ground ball, which tied the score at 3–3. One batter later, the wind caused catcher Smoky Burgess to drop Tony Kubek's foul pop-up for an error. Miller bailed Burgess out by striking out Kubek, and after Yogi Berra reached base on Don Zimmer's error, Miller got Hoyt Wilhelm to fly out to left to end the inning. In the top of the 10th inning, the defense behind Miller almost did him in; Nellie Fox walked and scored all the way from first on Boyer's three-base throwing error (the second by Boyer in as many innings) on Kaline's ground ball. Miller's teammates bailed him out in the bottom of the inning and made him the winning pitcher; Hank Aaron singled and scored on a double by Miller's Giant teammate Willie Mays to tie the score, then Mays scored the winning run on Roberto Clemente's single.

In 1962, Miller had his highest ERA since 1956, posting a 4.12 mark in 59 games (107 innings pitched), going 5–8 with 19 saves. Thinking he was washed up, the Giants traded him along with John Orsino and Mike McCormick to the Baltimore Orioles for Jack Fisher, Billy Hoeft and Jimmie Coker on December 15, 1962. He responded with a strong 1963 season in which the Associated Press reported, "Little Stuart has never been better." His record on the year was only 5–8, identical to his numbers from a season ago, but Miller led the American League in games (71), games finished (59), and saves (27) now serving as the Oriole closer; his ERA was 2.24, lowest since his rookie season. He and Leon Wagner were tied for 19th in AL MVP voting after the season.  Miller finished seventh in MVP voting in 1965, a year in which he had a 14–7 record, a 1.89 ERA, and 24 saves. His 1.89 ERA remains the lowest in franchise history since the team moved from St. Louis after the 1953 season.

On April 30, 1967, Steve Barber and Miller combined to pitch a no-hitter for the Orioles against the Detroit Tigers, but would lose 2–1. Miller entered after Barber, who walked ten batters, gave up the tying run on a wild pitch with two outs. A ground ball to shortstop should have ended it for Miller, but Mark Belanger misplayed it, his error allowing the winning run to score.

On May 14, 1967, he gave up Mickey Mantle's 500th career home run.

Jim Palmer credited Miller for helping him become a better pitcher. "I learned from guys like Stu Miller. I sat out in the bullpen with him when I was nineteen and watched and listened. It was like graduate school."

Pitching Style
Miller's "Butterfly Man" nickname came around as a result of his ability to fool hitters with a slow curveball. His fastball only topped out in the 80-mph range, but Miller relied on a deceptive delivery to get batters out. "He was the epitome of an off-speed pitcher, but he could get people out," teammate Eddie Watt said of Miller. "He had just tremendous deception and no fear at all." According to Miller, a catcher told him he could catch his pitches with pliers. "Really, my fastball was in the mid-80s, at most, and the changeup was a good 8 mph less. But both pitches looked the same, which was the secret to my deception," Miller said.

Death
Miller died January 4, 2015, at his home in Cameron Park, California, aged 87 after a brief illness.

See also
 List of Major League Baseball annual ERA leaders
 List of Major League Baseball annual saves leaders

References

Further reading

External links

1927 births
2015 deaths
Atlanta Braves players
Baltimore Orioles players
Baseball players from Massachusetts
Columbus Red Birds players
Hamilton Cardinals players
Major League Baseball pitchers
Minneapolis Millers (baseball) players
National League All-Stars
National League ERA champions
New York Giants (NL) players
Omaha Cardinals players
People from El Dorado County, California
People from Northampton, Massachusetts
Philadelphia Phillies players
San Francisco Giants players
St. Louis Cardinals players
Salisbury Cardinals players
Tulsa Oilers (baseball) players
Winston-Salem Cardinals players